Giuseppe Guerini (born 14 February 1970) is a retired Italian professional road bicycle racer. He was known throughout his career as a climbing specialist and had pronounced success in cycling's Grand Tour events.  He completed six editions of the Tour de France, five Vuelta a Españas and four  Giros, managing two third-place finishes in the 1997 and 1998 Giro d'Italia.

He began his professional career in 1993 with Navigare and subsequently joined Team Polti in 1996. It was during his tenure with team Polti that he achieved two podium finishes at the Giro d'Italia. He then switched to the German T-Mobile Team from 1999 to 2007. He retired from cycling at the end of 2007.

Further career highlights include a stage win in the 1998 Route du Sud, a stage win in the 1998 Volta a Portugal, a stage win in the 1999 Tour de France and again in the 2005 Tour de France, a stage win in the 2002 Catalan Week, and second place in the 2003 Tour de Suisse.

He is also remembered for an incident during the difficult Alpe d'Huez stage of the 1999 Tour de France. Guerini was leading the field and only a few hundred meters from the finish line when a cycling fan knocked him off his bicycle while attempting to take a photograph. Guerini was able to remount his bicycle and finish 21 seconds ahead of Pavel Tonkov.

Guerini is a native of Gazzaniga, Lombardy.

Career achievements

Major results

1988
 1st  Overall Giro della Lunigiana
1991
 3rd Overall Giro Ciclistico d'Italia
1994
 1st Stage 9 Volta a Portugal
 6th Overall Settimana Internazionale di Coppi e Bartali
1995
 3rd Tour du Haut Var
 3rd Gran Premio di Lugano
1996
 2nd Overall Route du Sud
1st Stage 3
 3rd Overall Tour de Romandie
1997
 3rd Overall Giro d'Italia
 5th Overall Tour de Romandie
1998
 3rd Overall Giro d'Italia
1st Stage 17
 5th Giro dell'Appennino
 9th Overall Giro del Trentino
1999
 1st Stage 10 Tour de France
 3rd Overall Vuelta a Castilla y León
 8th Overall Tour de Suisse
2000
 1st Stage 1 (TTT) Tour de Suisse
 8th Luk-Cup Bühl
2001
 7th Luk-Cup Bühl
2002
 2nd Overall Setmana Catalana de Ciclisme
1st Stage 3
2003
 2nd Overall Tour de Suisse
 8th Overall Euskal Bizikleta
2004
 8th Overall Tour de Suisse
2005
 1st Stage 19 Tour de France

Grand Tour overall classification results timeline

External links 

Official Tour de France results for Giuseppe Guerini

1970 births
Living people
People from Gazzaniga
Italian male cyclists
Italian Tour de France stage winners
Italian Giro d'Italia stage winners
Cyclists from the Province of Bergamo